Lincoln Palomeque (born March 20, 1977) is a Colombian actor.

Filmography

Films

Television

Awards and nominations

References

External links 

1977 births
Colombian male film actors
Colombian male telenovela actors
Living people
People from Cúcuta
20th-century Colombian male actors
21st-century Colombian male actors